Thomas A. Dunn (born October 12, 1942) is a member of the Illinois Gaming Board. Prior to this, he served as a Democratic member of the Illinois Senate and an associate judge in the Will County court system.

Biography
Dunn was born October 12, 1942, to Francis and Helen Dunn in Joliet, Illinois. He graduated from Joliet Catholic High School and went to work as a truck driver while attending St. Ambrose College. He graduated from St. Ambrose in 1964. In 1966, he joined the United States Marine Corps where he flew over 200 missions as a helicopter machine gunner during the Vietnam War. During his two-year military career, he was awarded four Air Medals, Permanent Air Combat Wings, and a Presidential Unit Citation. He graduated from DePaul University College of Law in 1971. During his legal career he worked in the office of the Cook County Public Defender and as a partner in the Joliet law firm of Dunn, Martin and Miller.

He served for a time as a member of the Illinois Democratic Central Committee. In 1986, he was elected to the Illinois Senate to succeed George E. Sangmeister in the 42nd district. The 42nd included the Joliet, New Lenox, Frankfort, and Lockport townships in Will County.

In the 1991 Republican controlled decennial redistricting process, Dunn was drawn into the 43rd district with fellow Democratic incumbent Jerome J. Joyce. The new 43rd included portions of Will, Kankakee and Iroquois counties. Jerome Joyce opted to retire early. Neither he or his successor and wife Janet J. Joyce opted to challenge Dunn for the Democratic nomination. In the general election, Dunn faced Democrat-turned-Republican Charles Pangle of Bradley.

During his time in the Senate, Dunn was the chief advocate to bring riverboat gambling to help his district. This came to fruition with the opening of Harrah's Joliet in 1993. He voted against the proposed Lake Calumet Airport in Hegewisch, Chicago and opposed repurposing the Joliet Arsenal for similar airport use. He served as a member of the Illinois Task Force on Crime and Corrections. Governor Jim Edgar charged the task force with the responsibilities to study future space needs, including costs, for correctional facilities; consider cost-effective alternatives to imprisonment; analyze current policies, statutes and sentencing procedures that affect inmate population; and identify solutions that protect both taxpayers' safety and their pocketbooks.

In 1997, he resigned upon his appointment to a judgeship. He was succeeded by Will County Democratic Party Chairman Larry Walsh of Elwood. He stepped down from the bench in 2005. In 2015, he was appointed by Governor Bruce Rauner to the Illinois Gaming Board.

References

1942 births
Living people
People from Joliet, Illinois
St. Ambrose University alumni
DePaul University College of Law alumni
Democratic Party Illinois state senators
Illinois state court judges
Illinois lawyers
United States Marine Corps personnel of the Vietnam War
United States Marines